Open is a monthly Mexican lifestyle magazine published by Editorial Metrosexual. Founded in 2005, the magazine covers different topics in each issue, such as art, cars, travel, restaurants, sex, gadgets and every other subject related to trendy men.

The editor-in-chief is Gabriel Bauducco.

Covers
The covers of the magazine have always been portrayed by the most "in" men in the arts, business, sports and culture such as Diego Torres, Alfredo Harp Calderoni, David Bisbal, Hugh Jackman and soccer player Rafael Márquez. The April's issue cover portrayed Alejandra Guzmán dressed as a man.

External links 
 Revista Open
 Gabriel Bauducco

2005 establishments in Mexico
Magazines established in 2005
Men's magazines published in Mexico
Monthly magazines published in Mexico
Spanish-language magazines